The Manchester Institute of Biotechnology, formerly the Manchester Interdisciplinary Biocentre (MIB) is a research institute of the University of Manchester, England.

Role
The centre has been designed to enable academic communities to explore specific areas of interdisciplinary quantitative bioscience, largely through the efforts of multidisciplinary research teams. Research at MIB follows three broadly defined, interdisciplinary and complementary themes: Biological Mechanism and Catalysis, Molecular Bioengineering, and Systems biology.

History
Planning for the institute began late in 1998 and culminated with the official opening on 25 October 2006 of the John Garside Building. The building won "Building of the Year" from Manchester Chamber's Building and Development Committee in 2006 along with Beetham Tower, Manchester.

The building has featured in several television commercials, notably Injury Lawyers 4u.

The institute was  renamed the Manchester Institute of Biotechnology on 1 June 2012, retaining the acronym MIB.

In November 2019 the MIB was awarded the Queen’s Anniversary Prize for Higher and Further Education. The award is a recognition of the MIB as a 'beacon of excellence' for work in Industrial Biotechnology.

References

External links 
 Manchester Institute of Biotechnology (MIB) – official website
 MIB description page at OpenWetWare

Biological research institutes in the United Kingdom
Biotechnology in the United Kingdom
Buildings and structures in Manchester
Departments of the University of Manchester
Research institutes established in 2006
Research institutes in Manchester
2006 establishments in England